Hyperolius laticeps is a species of frog in the family Hyperoliidae.
It is endemic to Togo.
Its natural habitats are rivers, swamps, freshwater marshes, and intermittent freshwater marshes.

References

laticeps
Endemic fauna of Togo
Amphibians described in 1931
Taxonomy articles created by Polbot